William A. Reid (September 26, 1893 – October 10, 1955) was an American basketball coach and administrator born in Detroit, Michigan.

As a high school player in Adrian, Michigan he led his Adrian High School team to a 1912 state title in basketball and then played in two sports in Colgate University. He returned to Colgate as a basketball coach and coached the Raiders from 1919 to 1928 with a record of 135–52. Beginning in 1936, he served as Colgate's director of athletics for 20 years.

Reid was a president of Eastern College Athletic Conference (ECAC) from 1944 to 1945 and vice-president of the National Collegiate Athletic Association (NCAA) from 1942 to 1946. He was enshrined in the Basketball Hall of Fame in 1963.

References

External links
 

1893 births
1955 deaths
Colgate Raiders athletic directors
Colgate Raiders men's basketball coaches
Colgate Raiders men's basketball players
National Collegiate Athletic Association people
Naismith Memorial Basketball Hall of Fame inductees
American military personnel of World War I
Baseball players from Michigan
Basketball coaches from Michigan
Basketball players from Detroit
American men's basketball players